Bryan William Adams (born March 20, 1977) is a Canadian former professional ice hockey winger who last played with EHC München of the Deutsche Eishockey Liga in Germany.

Playing career
Adams played a total of eleven games in the National Hockey League for the Atlanta Thrashers over two seasons (1999–2000 and 2000–01) scoring no goals, one assist, one point, and recording two penalty minutes.

He has found greater success in the DEL than the NHL. He joined the Iserlohn Roosters in 2003 and scored 39 goals and added 52 assists for 91 points in 131 games.  He later joined Kölner Haie in 2006 where he scored just 9 goals in 50 games, but made 24 assists for 33 points. In 2010, he joined newly-promoted EHC München and stayed for three seasons before retiring.

Career statistics

References

External links

1977 births
Living people
Atlanta Thrashers players
Canadian ice hockey left wingers
Chicago Wolves players
EHC München players
Grand Rapids Griffins players
Ice hockey people from British Columbia
Iserlohn Roosters players
Kölner Haie players
Michigan State Spartans men's ice hockey players
Orlando Solar Bears (IHL) players
People from the Regional District of Bulkley-Nechako
Undrafted National Hockey League players
Canadian expatriate ice hockey players in Germany